Connor Sheen (born 26 July 1996 in Liverpool) is an English professional squash player best known for his 14-minute defeat by Peter Creed at the British Nationals and for getting bageled by Matthew Hopkins.  As of February 2018, he was ranked number 180 in the world.

References

1996 births
Living people
English male squash players